Tommy "The Ghost" McCafferty is an Irish kickboxer. He was born in Letterkenny, County Donegal. McCafferty was the ISKA World Light middleweight and ISKA Middleweight kickboxing champion, 2008–2012. He competed in MMA holding belts at featherweight in the Chaos Fighting Championships and Immortal Fighting Championships. On August 16, McCafferty fought for the European MMA Promotion Cage Warriors Fighting Championship for the first time against Dean Reilly and won.

References

Year of birth missing (living people)
Living people
Irish male kickboxers
People from Letterkenny
Sportspeople from County Donegal